The Association of Presbyterian Colleges and Universities is a private, not-for-profit organization of colleges and universities associated with the Presbyterian Church (USA), a Mainline Protestant Christian religious denomination.

Member schools 

Agnes Scott College (Decatur, Georgia)
Alma College (Alma, Michigan)
Arcadia University (Glenside, Pennsylvania)
Austin College (Sherman, Texas)
Barber–Scotia College (Concord, North Carolina)
Belhaven University (Jackson, Mississippi)
Blackburn College (Carlinville, Illinois)
Bloomfield College (Bloomfield, New Jersey)
Buena Vista University (Storm Lake, Iowa)
Carroll University (Waukesha, Wisconsin)
Centre College (Danville, Kentucky)
Coe College (Cedar Rapids, Iowa)
The College of Idaho (Caldwell, Idaho)
College of the Ozarks (Point Lookout, Missouri)
The College of Wooster (Wooster, Ohio)
Cook College and Theological School (Tempe, Arizona)
Davidson College (Davidson, North Carolina)
Davis and Elkins College (Elkins, West Virginia)
Eckerd College (Saint Petersburg, Florida)
Hampden–Sydney College (Hampden Sydney, Virginia)
Hanover College (Hanover, Indiana)
Hastings College (Hastings, Nebraska)
Illinois College (Jacksonville, Illinois) (with the United Church of Christ)
Interamerican University of Puerto Rico (San Germán, Puerto Rico)
Johnson C. Smith University (Charlotte, North Carolina)
King University (Bristol, Tennessee)
Knoxville College (Knoxville, Tennessee)
Lake Forest College (Lake Forest, Illinois)
Lees–McRae College (Banner Elk, North Carolina)
Lindenwood University (Saint Charles, Missouri)
Lyon College  (Batesville, Arkansas)
Macalester College (Saint Paul, Minnesota)
Mary Baldwin University (Staunton, Virginia)
Maryville College  (Maryville, Tennessee)
Millikin University (Decatur, Illinois)
Missouri Valley College (Marshall, Missouri)
Monmouth College (Monmouth, Illinois)
Muskingum College (New Concord, Ohio)
Presbyterian College (Clinton, South Carolina)
Queens University of Charlotte (Charlotte, North Carolina)
Rhodes College (Memphis, Tennessee)
Rocky Mountain College (Billings, Montana)
Schreiner University (Kerrville, Texas)
Sheldon Jackson College (Sitka, Alaska)
St. Andrews University (Laurinburg, North Carolina)
Sterling College (Sterling, Kansas)
Stillman College (Tuscaloosa, Alabama)
Trinity University (San Antonio, Texas)
Tusculum College (Greeneville, Tennessee)
Universidad Interamericana de Puerto Rico (Numerous campuses in Puerto Rico)
University of Dubuque (Dubuque, Iowa)
University of Jamestown (Jamestown, North Dakota)
University of Pikeville (Pikeville, Kentucky)
University of the Ozarks (Clarksville, Arkansas)
University of Tulsa (Tulsa, Oklahoma)
Warren Wilson College (Asheville, North Carolina)
Waynesburg University (Waynesburg, Pennsylvania)
Westminster College (Fulton, Missouri)
Westminster College (New Wilmington, Pennsylvania)
Westminster College (Salt Lake City, Utah)
Whitworth University (Spokane, Washington)
William Peace University (Raleigh, North Carolina)
Wilson College (Chambersburg, Pennsylvania)

External links
Official website

College and university associations and consortia in the United States
Presbyterianism in the United States
Universities and colleges affiliated with the Presbyterian Church (USA)